Al-Raida  (English: The Woman Pioneer) is a quarterly peer-reviewed feminist academic journal covering women's and gender studies. Established in 1976, it is published by the Institute for Women's Studies in the Arab World at the Lebanese American University. Its mission is to "enhance networking between Arab women and women all over the world".

History
The Institute for Women's Studies in the Arab World was set up in 1973 at the Beirut University College, with funding from the Ford Foundation. This later morphed under the Lebanese American University. As the college was founded by Christian American missionaries, the journal was exclusively published in English for much of its history until the fall-winter edition of 2001 when an Arabic edition was published. Al-Raida published special issues on women in Arab cinema, women and the Lebanese Civil War, women and work, and violence against women. The journal is published in  English and Arabic.

Notable editors
Rose Ghurayeb

References

External links 
 

1976 establishments in Lebanon
Publications established in 1976
Quarterly journals
Feminist journals
Lebanese American University
Multilingual journals